Reza Haghighi (born 1 February 1989) is an Iranian footballer who last season played as a defender for Shahrdari Mahshahr.

Club career

Payam
Haghighi started his career with Payam. He made his debut for Payam on 10 November 2006 while he has 16 years old.

Fajr Sepasi
He joined Fajr Sepasi in the summer of 2009. He was chosen by Mahmoud Yavari as the club Captain before the starting of the 12th Iran Pro League. As of August 2012, he was named the Asian Best player of month by Goal.com Asia.

Persepolis
In the summer of 2012, Persepolis tried to acquire Haghighi but Fajr Sepasi rejected Persepolis's undisclosed bid (reported €220,000) and he had to stay at Fajr Sepasi. Ultimately, during the mid-season transfer window of the 12th Iran Pro League, the two teams reached an agreement on his transfer terms and Haghighi joined Persepolis on November 21, 2012. He signed a 2.5 year contract until the end of the 2014–15 season. He made his debut for Persepolis in a 6–0 win against Malavan in the 2012–13 Hazfi Cup Round of 32. He scored his first goal for Persepolis from a penalty kick in a match against Saipa on 28 February 2013. On December 27, 2014 he was officially released from Persepolis. He finished his career in Persepolis with 61 appearances and 3 goals.

Padideh
Haghighi joined Padideh in December 2014 with a contract until the end of season.

Saba Qom
Haghighi joined Saba Qom in the summer of 2015 with a two–year contract. He was released before mid season having only played six matches for the club.

Suphanburi
In January 2016 Haghighi signed a contract with Thai Premier League club Suphanburi. He played in a preseason game against Albirex Niigata for just 45 minutes, before the contract was canceled shortly before the season opening.

Return to Padideh
On 11 October 2016, Haghighi returned to Padideh by signing a seven-month contract.

Club career statistics

International career

On 12 February 2012, he was named in the Iran squad by Carlos Queiroz and made his debut in a match against Jordan on 23 February 2012. On 1 June 2014, he was called into Iran's 2014 FIFA World Cup squad by Carlos Queiroz.

Honours
Payam
 Azadegan League : Champion 2007–08
Persepolis
Iran Pro League runner-up: 2013–14
Iranian Hazfi Cup runner-up: 2012–13

References

External links
 Reza Haghighi at Persian League
 Reza Haghighi at TeamMelli.com
 
 Reza Haghighi at Footballdatabase
  Reza Haghighi at instagram
  Reza Haghighi at telegram

1989 births
Living people
Sportspeople from Mashhad
Iranian footballers
Association football defenders
Association football midfielders
Payam Mashhad players
Fajr Sepasi players
Persepolis F.C. players
Shahr Khodro F.C. players
Persian Gulf Pro League players
Azadegan League players
Iran international footballers
2014 FIFA World Cup players
Expatriate footballers in Thailand